Greece (GRE) competed with a team of 356 athletes at the 2001 Mediterranean Games in Tunis, Tunisia. The team achieved the best result for Greece in the history of the Games, winning 28 gold medals and 88 medals overall.

Medals

Gold
 Athletics 
100m: Aristotelis Gavelas
400 metres hurdles: Periklis Iakovakis
4x400 metres relay: Stylianos Dimotsios, Ioannis Lessis, Georgios Ikonomidis, Georgios Doupis
Decathlon: Prodromos Korkizoglou
Discus throw: Areti Ampatzi

 Gymnastics
Rings: Dimosthenis Tampakos
Parallel bars: Vasileios Tsolakidis
Horizontal bar: Vlasios Maras

 Karate
Men's open: Konstantinos Papadopoulos
Women's (– 65 kg): Theodora Dougeni

 Weightlifting
Men's (– 62 kg c&j): Leonidas Sabanis
Men's (– 94 kg snatch): Leonidas Kokas
Men's (– 94 kg c&j): Leonidas Kokas
Women's (– 63 kg snatch): Anastasia Tsakiri
Women's (– 63 kg c&j): Anastasia Tsakiri
Women's (– 69 kg c&j): Maria Tatsi
Women's (– 75 kg c&j): Filippia Kochliaridou
Women's (– +75 kg snatch): Katerina Roditi

 Wrestling
Men's (– 54 kg): Amiran Kardanov
Men's (– 63 kg): Besik Aslanasvili
Men's (– 97 kg): Aftandil Xanthopoulos
Women's (– 51 kg): Sofia Poumpouridou

 Swimming
Men's 1500m Freestyle: Spyridon Gianniotis
Men's 4x200 Freestyle: Dimitrios Manganas, Nikolaos Xylouris, Athanasios Oikonomou, Spyridon Gianniotis
Women's 200m Freestyle: Zoi Dimoschaki

 Tennis
Men's Singles: Konstantinos Economidis
Men's Doubles: Konstantinos Economidis, Anastasios Vasiliadis
Women's Doubles: Eleni Daniilidou, Maria Pavlidou

See also
 Greece at the 2000 Summer Olympics
 Greece at the 2004 Summer Olympics

References

http://www.cijm.org.gr/

Nations at the 2001 Mediterranean Games
2001
Mediterranean Games